Stuart Edward Garnham (born 30 November 1955) is an English former footballer, who played as goalkeeper. He is now a Science teacher in Sunne, Sweden.

Career
Garnham played for Wolverhampton Wanderers, Northampton Town F.C. and Peterborough United F.C. before going to Sweden. In 1978, he joined Karlstads BK. In 1981, he joined Djurgårdens IF from Karlstads BK. He made eight Allsvenskan appearances for Djurgården.

Personal life
Garham's son Robin represented the British national team at the 2012 Summer Olympics in London.

References

English footballers
English expatriate footballers
Wolverhampton Wanderers F.C. players
Northampton Town F.C. players
Peterborough United F.C. players
Djurgårdens IF Fotboll players
Degerfors IF players
Allsvenskan players
Expatriate footballers in Sweden
Living people
1955 births
People from Selby
Association football goalkeepers